Melt-Banana Lite Live ver 0.0 is a live album by Melt-Banana. It was released on November 3, 2009.

Background and recording

Melt-Banana perform some of their shows under the name "Melt-Banana Lite", an alternate configuration of the band that replaces guitars and drums with samplers and synthesizers; some shows additionally replaced the drum kit with a drum machine. This set-up was prompted, in part, by the difficulties of transporting instruments while touring, and a desire to make it easier and more convenient. Musically, the style was suggested by vocalist Yasuko Onuki, who made some demos that featured only drums, a theremin and her vocals. As Onuki came up with the idea ahead of a planned tour with drummer Dave Witte, guitarist Ichirou Agata believed she wanted to highlight the speed of Witte's drumming by removing the guitars. After their tour with Witte, Melt-Banana continued to play shows under the new configuration, typically with a drum machine.

Reception

Alex Deller of Rock Sound gave it a 7/10, saying that despite the change in instruments, "this is still the bat-shit crazy Melt-Banana that have had you crawling the walls for the best part of 15 years."

Track listing

References

Melt-Banana albums
2009 live albums